Lynn Hoffman was a Philadelphia novelist born in Brooklyn. Before writing his first novel, The Bachelor's Cat (1997) he was a merchant seaman, a chef and a college teacher.

His most recent novel, bang BANG is a story of a Philadelphia woman who is the victim of a gun crime. She finds out that her grief-stricken words, taken out of context, are being used by a creepy senator and gun industry stooges. Finding herself the unwitting proponent of a political stance she abhors, Paula embarks on a decidedly offbeat one-woman vigilante crusade to bring the gun trade to its knees, a crusade that involves an air pistol, sex and a most unusual use of Sauternes.

BookList called bang BANG "Brilliant" Amazon top critic Grady Harp called it ", a book so well conceived and stylishly written that it places Hoffman in the realm of top American writers."

Hoffman's other writings are about food and wine and he is the author of The New Short Course in Wine a textbook for college students and The Short Course in Beer: a guide to the world's most civilized drink. The Philadelphia Inquirer's Craig LaBan said:

References 

20th-century American novelists
21st-century American novelists
American food writers
American male novelists
Writers from Brooklyn
Living people
20th-century American male writers
21st-century American male writers
Novelists from New York (state)
20th-century American non-fiction writers
21st-century American non-fiction writers
American male non-fiction writers
Year of birth missing (living people)